Sviatoslav Shramchenko (May 3, 1893 – June 24, 1958) was a Ukrainian military and community leader, captain lieutenant of the Ukrainian People's Republic Navy, writer and famous philatelist (had a collection of 16,000 stamps). He was a son of Oleksandr Shramchenko, Ukrainian ethnographer.

Biography 

Sviatoslav Shramchenko was born in Baku (Azerbaijan, Russian Empire) on May 3, 1893. He graduated from first classical school in Kyiv, then Gardes de la Marine School and the Military Law Academy in Petrograd.

After the First World War Shramchenko became one of founders of the Navy Ukrainian People's Republic and Ukrainian State. In 1917 he was a participant of ukrainization in the Baltic Fleet. At the time of the Hetmanate and the Directorate he was a permanent adjutant of the marine ministers, in 1919 Shramchenko for some time acted as Minister of Marine.

After the end of Ukrainian War of Independence Sviatoslav Shramchenko emigrated to Częstochowa (Poland), where he was a head of various Ukrainian organizations. In 1957 he left Poland and settled in Philadelphia, US. Here he wrote a lot of articles and publications on naval and military themes in different magazines.

On June 24, 1958 Shramchenko died of a heart attack. He was buried at Orthodox Cemetery in South Bound Brook.

External links 
 
 Шрамченко Святослав  // Довідник з історії України / За ред. І. З. Підкови, Р. М. Шуста; Інст. історичних досліджень Львівського нац. унів. ім. Івана Франка. — Київ: Генеза, 2001. — . 

1893 births
1958 deaths
Ukrainian admirals
Military officers of the Ukrainian People's Republic
Ukrainian language activists